Larry Price is a former member of the Ohio House of Representatives, representing the Columbus, Ohio area

References

Democratic Party members of the Ohio House of Representatives
Living people
Year of birth missing (living people)
21st-century American politicians